{|

{{Infobox ship career
|Hide header=
|Ship country=United States
|Ship flag=
|Ship name=USS Susanne (proposed)
|Ship namesake=Previous name retained (proposed)
|Ship owner=
|Ship operator=
|Ship registry=
|Ship route=
|Ship ordered=
|Ship awarded=
|Ship original cost=
|Ship yard number=
|Ship way number=
|Ship laid down=
|Ship launched=
|Ship sponsor=
|Ship christened=
|Ship completed=
|Ship acquired=Never
|Ship commissioned=Never
|Ship recommissioned=
|Ship decommissioned=
|Ship maiden voyage= 
|Ship in service=
|Ship out of service=
|Ship renamed=
|Ship reclassified=
|Ship refit=
|Ship struck=
|Ship reinstated=
|Ship homeport=
|Ship identification=
|Ship motto=
|Ship nickname=
|Ship honours=
|Ship honors=
|Ship captured=
|Ship fate=
|Ship notes=Operated as civilian motorboat Susanne; had no U.S. Navy service
|Ship badge=
}}

|}
USS Susanne (SP-832) was the proposed name and designation for a motorboat that the United States Navy inspected for possible naval service in 1917 but never acquired or commissioned.
 Susanne was built as a private motorboat by the Matthews Boat Company at Port Clinton, Ohio. Either just prior to the entry of the United States into World War I in April 1917, or shortly afterwards, she was examined for possible U.S. Navy service and given the section patrol registry number SP-832.

Notes

References
 Department of the Navy Naval History and Heritage Command Online Library of Selected Images: Civilian Ships: Susanne (Motor Boat)
 NavSource Online: Section Patrol Craft Photo Archive: Susanne (SP 832)

Cancelled ships of the United States Navy
Ships built in Port Clinton, Ohio